Collaborative e-democracy is a democratic conception that combines key features of direct democracy, representative democracy, and e-democracy (i.e. the use of ICTs for democratic processes). The concept was first published at two international academic conferences in 2009 (see below).

Collaborative e-democracy refers to a political system in which governmental stakeholders (politicians/parties, ministers, parliamentarians etc.) and non-governmental stakeholders (NGOs, political lobbies, local communities, individual citizens, etc.) collaborate on the development of public laws and policies. This collaborative policymaking process is conducted on a governmental social networking site in which all citizens are members (collaborative e-policy-making).

While directly elected government officials (i.e. ‘proxy representatives’) would conduct the vast majority of law and policy-making processes (representative democracy), the citizens would retain their final voting power on each issue (direct democracy). Additionally each citizen would be empowered to propose their own policies to the electorate and thus initiate new policy processes where applicable (initiative). Collaboratively generated policies would consider the opinion of a larger proportion of the citizenry; therefore they may be more just, more sustainable, and thus easier to implement.

Theoretical background 
Collaborative e-democracy involves following theory components:
 Collaborative democracy, a “political framework where electors and the elected actively collaborate to attain the best possible solution to any situation using collaborative enabling technologies to facilitate wide scale citizen participation in government”.
 Collaborative e-policymaking (or CPM) is a software facilitated five phase policy process in which every citizen participates directly or indirectly (i.e. via proxy representatives). The process is conducted on a governmental social networking site in which all citizens are members. Each citizen can suggest issues, rank and evaluate the suggestions of others, and vote on the laws and policies that will affect them. [At a general level, CPM is a universal process that would facilitate every organisation (e.g. business, government) or self-selected group (e.g. union, online community) to co-create their own regulations (e.g. laws, code of conduct) and strategies (e.g. government actions, business strategies) by involving all stakeholders in the corresponding decision-processes.] 
Proxy voting and liquid democracy: Direct democracy would require each citizen to vote on each policy issue each time. As this would overburden most people, the citizens in a collaborative e-democracy delegate trusted representatives (or proxies) to vote on their behalf on all those issues and/or domains where they lack of time, experience, or interest for direct participation. Although the proxy votes on the principals behalf, the principal retains the final voting power on each issue. Thus proxy representation combines the best features of direct democracy and representative democracy on the social networking site.

Policy process 
Collaborative e-policymaking is a process where public laws & policies are generated in collaboration of multiple stakeholders (e.g. affected people; domain experts; parties who can help to implement a solution). Each new policy cycle starts with the identification of a collective problem or goal by the collective of participants (i.e. citizens, experts, proxy representatives).
 Suggestion & ranking phase: Each participant is encouraged to submit policy proposals for how to solve the identified problem / achieve the goal (policy crowdsourcing). The submissions are ranked so that the policy with the most supporters appears on top of the others.
 Evaluation phase: For each top-ranked proposal (i.e. law or government action) the upsides and downsides of its implementation are defined so that the collective can evaluate how they would be affected by each policy. The evaluation process is supported by independent domain experts.
 Voting phase: Based on the co-created information the collective votes for the proposal that is considered to be optimal for solving the collective problem / achieving the goal. As a result, a new law is introduced or a new government action executed.
 Revision phase: A pre-determined period after implementation the collective is addressed to determine whether the problem was solved / the goal achieved by the selected policy or not. If yes, the policy cycle concludes; if no, the process starts over with the suggestion phase until the issue is resolved.

To be clear, CPM is automated as a software process that is conducted on the governmental social networking site.

Principles 
Collaborative e-democracy is based on following core principles:
Self-government, the ideal of direct democracy, and “quod omnes tangit ab omnibus approbetur”, the ancient maxim from the Roman law that says “that which affects all people must be approved by all people”. This principle is in sharp contrast to representative democracy where the public policymaking process is biased by corporate lobbies (Corporatocracy).
Open source governance, a political philosophy which advocates the application of the philosophies of the open source and open content movements to democratic principles in order to enable any interested citizen to add to the creation of policy.
 Aggregation: One function of the social networking site is to aggregate the citizens’ opinions on issues (e.g. agreement with a certain policy). Based on this communality people can form ad hoc groups to address these issues.
Collaboration: Another function facilitates the collaboration of likeminded people on common issues (e.g. the co-creation of a policy proposal) within aggregated groups and/or between independent groups. Besides groups with controversial strategies / perspectives which focus on similar outcomes compete with each other.
Collective intelligence: The CPM process harnesses the peoples’ collective intelligence, i.e. a shared group intelligence that emerges from the aggregation, collaboration, competition and (consensus) decision-making of the various stakeholders. This group intelligence is utilised to identify issues and to co-create solutions that are optimal / sustainable for most people. Collective intelligence reflects a design pattern of Web 2.0.
 Collective learning & Adoption: The direct democracy component of collaborative e-democracy shifts the responsibility of policymaking from government teams (top down) to the collective of citizens (bottom up). As the people are confronted with the consequences of their own decisions a collective learning process is initiated. Collaborative e-democracy is not a static construct but flexible and open to change, by quickly integrating learning experiences and by collectively adopting to new social, economical or environmental circumstances. This principle reflects ‘Perpetual Beta’, another design pattern of Web 2.0.

Benefits and limitations 
The concept of collaborative e-democracy intends to achieve following benefits:

Transparency and accessibility: The CPM process would be transparent and accessible for all citizens via the internet.
Political efficacy: Allowing citizens to participate in government processes would increase the political efficacy and counteract the democratic deficit.
Deliberation: The governmental social networking site as main platform for political information & communication would increase the quality of deliberation between the various governmental and non-governmental stakeholders of the nation.
 Collective awareness: Large scale online participation would increase the public awareness of the collective problems, goals, or policy issues (e.g. the opinions of minorities) and facilitate harnessing the nation's collective intelligence for collaboratively developing policies.

On the contrary the concept has several limitations:

Constitutional limits: Most democratic nations have constitutional limits to direct democracy; governments may be unwilling to relinquish such policy-making authority to the collective.
Digital divide: People without internet access would be disadvantaged in a collaborative e-democracy. Therefore, traditional democratic procedures would be made available until the digital divide is concluded.
Majority rule: Such as in most democratic decision processes majorities could over vote minorities. The evaluation process would however give a fair warning when a minority group would be significantly discriminated against by a certain policy.
Naivety:  Voters may lack a thorough understanding of the facts and data surrounding their options.  This could lead to misplaced votes which do not represent the voters' actual will.  However, the proxy voting / delegation included in the system greatly mitigates this problem.  Increased education, critical thinking and reasoning skills (all of which could occur naturally through a better form of government), and usage of the internet should also help reduce the problem. Also, the CPM process involves proxies and experts to inform people upon the implications of the suggested policies before a decision is made.

Research and development 
In 2009 the two conceptions, collaborative e-democracy and collaborative e-policy-making, were  first published at two academic conferences on e-governance and e-democracy:
 Petrik, Klaus (2009) “Participation and e-Democracy: How to utilize Web 2.0 for policy decision-making”; the 10th International Digital Government Research Conference: "Social Networks: Making Connections between Citizens, Data & Government" in Puebla, Mexico;
 Petrik, Klaus (2009) “Deliberation and Collaboration in the Policy Process: A Web 2.0 approach”;  The 3rd Conference on Electronic Democracy in Vienna, Austria.
 A third publication appears in the "Journal of eDemocracy and Open Government", Vol 2, No 1 (2010).

See also 
 Democracy
 Consensus democracy
 Deliberative democracy
 Direct democracy
 Inclusive democracy
 Liquid democracy
 Participatory democracy
 Representative democracy
 E-democracy
 Civic technology
 Online petition
 Electronic voting
 E-rulemaking
 Mass collaboration
 Online deliberation
 Open-source governance
 Web 2.0
 Crowdsourcing
 E-participation
 Social networking site

References

External links 
 The Future of E-Democracy – The 50 Year Plan
 Collaborative Policy Making and Administration: The Operational Demands of Local Economic Development
  The Institute for 21st Century Agoras
 Collaborative democracy: A new era of public policy in Australia
 Democracy at the Local Level: The International IDEA Handbook on Participation, Representation, Conflict Management, and Governance
 The Wisdom of Crowds: Why the Many Are Smarter Than the Few and How Collective Wisdom Shapes Business, Economies, Societies and Nations

E-democracy
Political theories
Election technology
Politics and technology
Types of democracy